Música popular (Spanish and Portuguese for popular music) may refer to:

Música popular brasileira, a style of bossa nova from Brazil
Música popular (Colombia), a music genre from Colombia